The following list of Carnegie libraries in Washington provides detailed information on United States Carnegie libraries in Washington, where 43 libraries were built from 33 grants (totaling $1,046,000) awarded by the Carnegie Corporation of New York from 1901 to 1916. Of the 43 libraries built, 32 still stand and out of those, 14 still serve their original purpose.

Key

Carnegie libraries

Notes

References

Note: The above references, while all authoritative, are not entirely mutually consistent. Some details of this list may have been drawn from one of the references without support from the others.  Reader discretion is advised.

Washington
Libraries
 
 
Libraries